James Parks Jones (1890 – January 11, 1950) was an actor in many silent films in the United States. His roles included many leading and supporting roles over more than a decade.

He was born in Cincinnati.

Jones married Myrtle Gonzalez, a Latin American actress, in 1910. They had one son together, James Parks Jones, Jr. (c. 1911–1970), before divorcing.

Filmography
The Arab (1915 film) (1915)
Young Romance (1915 film) (1915)The Trail of the Lonesome Pine (1916)	Alien Souls (1916)The Lonesome Chap (1917)The Evil Eye (1917)
Such a Little Pirate (1918)
Sandy (1918 film) (1918)
The Whispering Chorus (1918)
Till I Come Back to You (1918)	
Old Wives for New (1918)
A Dog's Life (1918), a Charlie Chaplin film
Shoulder Arms (1918)
The Intrusion of Isabel (1919)
Sunnside (1919), a Chaplin film	
Deliverance (1919)
The Black Gate (1919)
Faith (1920)
Perils of Paul or the Duchess at Bay, also known as Paul's Peril, (1920)
The Little Shepherd of Kingdom Come (1920)
The Old Nest (1921)
Hawk of the Hills (1927), a serial
Salvation Jane (film) (1927)

References

External links

1890 births
1950 deaths
American male silent film actors
20th-century American male actors
Actors from Cincinnati